The 2008 Tour du Haut Var was the 40th edition of the Tour du Haut Var cycle race and was held on 24 February 2008. The race started and finished in Draguignan. The race was won by Davide Rebellin.

General classification

References

2008
2008 in road cycling
2008 in French sport